Antisexualism is opposition or hostility towards sexual behavior and sexuality.

Terminology
Other terms whose meanings overlap or are synonymous or interchangeable with antisexualism include sex-negativism, sex-negative movement, sex-negativity, antisexuality, demonization of sex or as an adjective, anti-sex or sex-negative. In a broader scope, it may refer to a general opposition to sexuality, especially tending to reduce or eliminate the sex drive or sexual activity or a prudish and coitophobic force in society that suppresses sexual freedom and disseminates antisexual opinions. When such an aversion involves hatred, it is sometimes called miserotia or miserotism.

Religious

Some forms of early ascetic Gnosticism held all matter to be evil, and that unnecessary gratifications of the physical senses were to be avoided.  Married couples were encouraged to be chaste.  The Skoptsys were a radical sect of the Russian Orthodox Church that practiced castration and amputation of sexual organs.  The Skoptsy believed that Christ had been castrated during his crucifixion, and it was this castration that brought about salvation. Boston Corbett, who was involved in killing John Wilkes Booth, castrated himself after being mocked and tempted by prostitutes. Ann Lee was the founder of the Shakers, a radical Protestant sect that opposed procreation and all sexual activity.  The Shakers were more opposed to pregnancy than anything else. Father Divine, founder of the International Peace Mission Movement, advocated religious abstinence from sex and marriage and taught that sexual objectification is a root cause of undesirable social and political conditions.

James Baldwin in The Fire Next Time refers to the United States as an antisexual country dominated by a white culture that regards sensual or soulful behavior by Black Americans as suspect. This contributes to a crisis of Baldwin's Christian faith because it shows that the world does not accept him, and that Christianity has not made white people accepting.

Non-religious
Philosopher Immanuel Kant viewed humans as being subject to the animalistic desires of self-preservation, species-preservation, and the preservation of enjoyment. He argued that humans have a duty to avoid maxims that harm or degrade themselves, including suicide, sexual degradation, and drunkenness. This led Kant to regard sexual intercourse as degrading because it "makes of the loved person an Object of appetite", rather than focusing on their inherent worth as rational beings, which violates Kant's second formulation of the categorical imperative, a philosophical concept he created to judge the morality of actions. He admitted sex only within marriage, which he regarded as "a merely animal union".

Criticism 
Friedrich Nietzsche has many criticisms of Jesus and Christianity. In Human, All Too Human, and Twilight of the Idols for example, Nietzsche accuses the Church's and Jesus' teachings as being anti-natural in their treatment of passions, in particularly sexuality: "There [In the Sermon on the Mount] it is said, for example, with particular reference to sexuality: 'If thy eye offend thee, pluck it out.' Fortunately, no Christian acts in accordance with this precept... the Christian who follows that advice and believes he has killed his sensuality is deceiving himself: it lives on in an uncanny vampire form and torments in repulsive disguises."

Antisexualism drew sharp criticism from Bertrand Russell in his Marriage and Morals:

According to Bertrand Russell, an anti-sexual attitude must be regarded as purely superstitious and those who first inculcated antisexualism must have suffered from a diseased condition of body or mind, or both (Marriage and Morals, chapter "CHRISTIAN ETHICS").

Anaphrodisiacs
John Harvey Kellogg, the inventor of the "corn flakes" variety of breakfast cereal, was opposed to all forms of sexual activity, especially masturbation. The Road to Wellville satirized his life and practices. According to some sources, the early Christian theologian Origen castrated himself to avoid temptation and remain pure. Female circumcision may have been developed to discourage women from having sex.

Fictional
 The Junior Anti-Sex League, in George Orwell's dystopian novel Nineteen Eighty-Four, was a group of young adult Party members devoted to banning all sexual intercourse.
 The film Demolition Man takes place in a future in which sexual intercourse is banned – reproduction is achieved clinically and the experience itself is simulated through virtual reality.
 The song "Samurai Abstinence Patrol" by comedy music duo Ninja Sex Party, is about a group known as the Samurai Abstinence Patrol who ban all sex in the future.

See also

Asceticism
Antinatalism
Asexuality
Cathar Perfect
Celibacy
Erotophobia
Misanthropy
Opposition to pornography
Prude
Puritanism
Reproductive rights
Right to sexuality
Sexual abstinence
Sexual and reproductive health and rights
Sexual revolution
Sex-positive

References

Sexual abstinence
Social movements
Non-sexuality
Opposition to masturbation
Prudishness
Sexuality-related prejudices